Malepa Bolelang (born 25 February 1982) is a Botswanan footballer who is currently retired. He has won 25 caps and has scored 2 goals for the Botswana national football team.

References

External links
 

1982 births
Living people
Botswana footballers
Botswana international footballers
ECCO City Green players
Motlakase Power Dynamos players
Association football forwards